Borja Docal Sáiz (born 3 October 1991) is a Spanish footballer who plays as either a left-back or a left winger.

Club career
Docal was born in Santander, Cantabria. A product of local giants Racing de Santander's youth system, he made his first-team debut on 19 August 2012, starting in a 0–1 home loss against UD Las Palmas in the Segunda División. He scored his first professional goal the following 23 March but in another defeat, this time 3–2 at CD Lugo. He finished his first season with the main squad with 14 starts and 1,314 minutes of action, suffering relegation.

On 14 July 2013, Docal signed with fellow second-tier club CD Mirandés. He returned to Racing the following year, and subsequently had abroad spells with FK Senica (Slovak Super Liga) and FC Dynamo Brest (Belarusian Premier League) before returning to Spain in 2018 with Gimnástica de Torrelavega.

Personal life
Docal's second cousin, Sergio Canales – their paternal grandmothers being sisters – was also a footballer.

References

External links

1991 births
Living people
Spanish footballers
Footballers from Santander, Spain
Association football defenders
Association football wingers
Segunda División players
Segunda División B players
Tercera División players
Rayo Cantabria players
Racing de Santander players
CD Mirandés footballers
Gimnástica de Torrelavega footballers
Slovak Super Liga players
FK Senica players
Belarusian Premier League players
FC Dynamo Brest players
Spanish expatriate footballers
Expatriate footballers in Slovakia
Expatriate footballers in Belarus
Spanish expatriate sportspeople in Slovakia
Spanish expatriate sportspeople in Belarus